Chopoqlu (also Romanized as Chopoqlū, Chopoqolū, and Chepoqlū; also known as Chibuklu, Chopūqlū, and Chūbūqlu) is a village in Karasf Rural District, in the Central District of Khodabandeh County, Zanjan Province, Iran. At the 2006 census, its population was 177, in 40 families.

References 

Populated places in Khodabandeh County